Dalilu (also Romanized as Dalīlū; also known as Dalīlar and Valī Qolī Qeshlāqī) is a village in Fuladlui Jonubi Rural District, Hir District, Ardabil County, Ardabil Province, Iran. At the 2006 census, its population was 335, in 63 families.

References 

Towns and villages in Ardabil County